Kotori is a feminine Japanese given name. Notable people with the name include:

, Japanese voice actress
Kotori Momoyuki, manga artist of Pink Innocent and Princess Debut
, Japanese television personality, model, singer and voice actress
Kotori Music, American Riddim dubstep producer and DJ.

Fictional characters
, a character in the visual novel If My Heart Had Wings
, a character in the visual novel Kita e
, a character in the manga series Cat Paradise
, a character in the manga series Sweetness and Lightning
, a character in the light novel series Date A Live
, a character in the visual novel Rewrite
, a character in the media franchise Love Live!
, English name Tori Meadows, a character in the anime series Yu-Gi-Oh! Zexal
, a character in the manga series X
, a character in the light novel series Magical Girl Raising Project
, a character in the visual novel Triangle Heart
, a character in the video game series The Idolmaster
, a character in the visual novel Da Capo
, a character in the manga series Brynhildr in the Darkness

Japanese feminine given names